is a Japanese footballer currently playing as a goalkeeper for Fukushima United.

Career
On 11 January 2023, Fantini return to Fukushima United for upcoming 2023 season after loan at Renofa Yamaguchi during a season cause not played in club.

Personal life
Fantini was born in Ichikawa, Chiba due to Italian father and Japanese mother.

Career statistics

Club
.

Notes

References

External links

1998 births
Living people
People from Ichikawa, Chiba
Association football people from Chiba Prefecture
Japanese footballers
Italian footballers
Japanese people of Italian descent
Association football goalkeepers
J2 League players
J3 League players
A.C. Cesena players
Sagan Tosu players
Fukushima United FC players
Renofa Yamaguchi FC players